Tsegmidiin Namsraijav (1927–1987) was a Mongolian composer. He is perhaps best known for the melody to the popular song "Khaluun elgen nutag" (Country of the Heart), his Festive Overture composed in 1971, and his "Baatarlag Marsh" (Heroic March). He was the first conductor of the Mongolian Symphony Orchestra after its establishment in 1957.

References

External links

Mongolian composers
1927 births
1987 deaths
20th-century classical composers
Mongolian conductors (music)
20th-century conductors (music)
Male classical composers
20th-century male musicians
Honored Artists of Mongolia
People's Artists of Mongolia